The 2014 Basingstoke and Deane Borough Council election took place on 22 May 2014 to elect members of Basingstoke and Deane Borough Council in England. This was on the same day as other local elections. These elections were postponed from the usual first Thursday of May in order to coincide with the 2014 European Parliamentary Elections.

22 seats out of 60 seats were up for election. Due to the resignation of a councillor elected in 2012, Brighton Hill South had two seats for re-election. The first-placed finisher was elected to a regular four-year term and the second-placed finisher was elected to serve until 2016. Another councillor had stood down in Baughurst and Tadley North, and thus a councillor was elected to fill out the 2011–15 term in that seat.

The Conservatives had lost their majority on the council in 2013 due to defections, and since then had operated a minority administration. They lost a single seat (Buckskin) to Labour and continued their minority administration. In Basing, a councillor who had been elected as a Conservative in 2010 was re-elected as an independent.

Election Result 
The Conservative Party performed best with a third of the vote share, but lost one seat to an independent. Labour retained their position as the largest opposition party, gaining three seats from the Liberal Democrats (Brookvale and Kings Furlong, Brighton Hill North and Brighton Hill South). As such, both the Conservatives and the Labour party won 8 seats in this election, but the Conservatives remained the largest party overall, with 29 seats compared to Labours 17. UKIP won their first elected seat on the council, gaining the second seat in Brighton Hill South that had been vacated by Labour. Alongside the one independent gain, Ian Tilbury held his seat in Overton, Laverstoke and Steventon.

Results by Ward

Basing

Baughurst and Tadley North By-election

Brighton Hill North

Brighton Hill South

Brookvale and Kings Furlong

Buckskin

Burghclere, Highclere and St Mary Bourne

Chineham

East Woodhay

Eastrop

Grove

Hatch Warren and Beggarwood

Kempshott

Norden

Oakley and North Waltham

Overton, Laverstoke and Steventon

Popley East

Popley West

South Ham

Whitchurch

Winklebury

References

2014 English local elections
2014
2010s in Hampshire